The Readhead Baronetcy, of Westoe in the Borough of South Shields in the County Palatine of Durham, was a title in the Baronetage of the United Kingdom. It was created on 20 January 1922 for James Readhead. He was chairman and managing director of John Readhead and Sons, shipbuilders, of South Shields. The third Baronet did not use his title. On his death in 1988 the title became extinct.

Readhead Baronets, of Westoe (1922)
Sir James Readhead, 1st Baronet (died 1930)
Sir James Halder Readhead, 2nd Baronet (1879–1940)
James Templeman Readhead, presumed 3rd Baronet (1910–1988)

Arms

Notes

References
Kidd, Charles, Williamson, David (editors). Debrett's Peerage and Baronetage (1990 edition). New York: St Martin's Press, 1990.

External links
History of John Readhead and Sons

Extinct baronetcies in the Baronetage of the United Kingdom